Matthew John Serra (born June 2, 1974) is an American former professional mixed martial artist and Brazilian Jiu-Jitsu practitioner who competed for the Ultimate Fighting Championship. He is the co-star of Dana White: Lookin' for a Fight and co-host of the official podcast of the UFC, UFC Unfiltered, alongside Jim Norton. Serra defeated Pete Spratt, Shonie Carter and Chris Lytle en route to becoming The Ultimate Fighter 4 Welterweight Tournament Winner. He captured the UFC Welterweight Championship immediately after. Serra also served as the head coach for The Ultimate Fighter 6 reality show opposite Matt Hughes, and he is a member of the UFC Hall of Fame. In grappling, Serra holds a Silver Medal in the ADCC Submission Wrestling World Championship.

Serra began practicing martial arts at an early age, first studying Wing Chun. In the 1990s, he began practicing Brazilian jiu-jitsu under Renzo Gracie and obtained black belt rank in May 2000, the first American to do so under Renzo. In addition to competitive bouts with UFC Hall of Famers Matt Hughes and B.J. Penn, Serra's biggest accomplishment in mixed martial arts came at UFC 69 where he defeated Georges St-Pierre in a Knockout of the Night award-winning performance to capture the UFC Welterweight Championship.

Background
Serra was born to an Italian-American family in East Meadow, New York. His father is a retired policeman in New York City and his late mother was a stay-at-home mom. Serra has older sister and brother, and two younger brothers. Serra's father was enthuasistic about mixed martial arts, and Matt first began Wing Chun at an early age. As a teenager he began competing in wrestling.

Serra went to East Meadow High School, and had already enrolled in the USMC Delayed Entry Program before graduating. However, Serra got into a physical altercation at work in a local pizzeria during which he bit off the other participant's ear, leading to disfigurement charges. Despite acting in self-defense and the original charge being commuted into a misdemeanor, his military career was over prematurely because the original charge was a felony.

Mixed martial arts career

Early career
At age of 18 he began Brazilian jiu-jitsu after finding out about the sport from Black Belt magazine. Serra won first place at the Brazilian jiu-jitsu Pan American Championship in 1999 and won third place at the 2000 World Championships in Brazil in the brown belt division. Continuing his martial arts career, he competed in the ADCC Submission Wrestling World Championship choking out Takanori Gomi, winning a decision over Jean Jacques Machado, and placing 2nd in the 66–76 kg division after forfeiting the final against Marcio Feitosa due to being told to step down by Renzo Gracie as part of a hierarchical respect system within the Gracie lineage. Serra was invited to compete in PRIDE 9 against Johil de Oliveira but the bout was called off at the last minute when Oliveira was burned in a pyrotechnics accident backstage. Soon after, Matt began to compete in the UFC where he built up a record of four wins and four losses. One of the losses was a close decision fight with future Welterweight and Lightweight champion B.J. Penn which would have earned him a title shot in the failed Lightweight tournament.

Ultimate Fighting Championship

The Ultimate Fighter
In 2006, Matt became a participant on The Ultimate Fighter 4: The Comeback on SpikeTV. On the show, Serra defeated Pete Spratt and Shonie Carter to reach the finals, his win against Carter avenging his infamous highlight-reel KO loss to Carter at UFC 31. On November 11, 2006, Serra defeated Chris Lytle at The Ultimate Fighter: The Comeback Finale by split decision to become the Ultimate Fighter 4 Welterweight Tournament Champion.

His win earned him a guaranteed title shot against Georges St-Pierre for the UFC Welterweight Championship, as well as a $100,000 contract and $100,000 sponsorship with Xyience.

Winning the welterweight title
Serra fought St-Pierre on April 7, 2007, at UFC 69, and won the UFC Welterweight Championship by TKO via punches at 3:25 in the first round. Prior to the fight Serra was considered a substantial underdog and consequently the fight is considered to be one of the biggest upsets in MMA history.

The Ultimate Fighter coach
Serra coached season 6 of The Ultimate Fighter reality show with Matt Hughes. Team Serra finished 6–2 in the first round of fights, winning six consecutive times which gave Serra the right to pick the fights in the second round. However, from then on Serra did not corner a single fighter to victory and saw all his trainees eventually lose out. The finale saw Team Hughes fighters Tommy Speer and Mac Danzig face each other for the title of Ultimate Fighter.

Serra said in season 6 of The Ultimate Fighter that Joe Scarola lost his job at Serra's jiu-jitsu school for quitting The Ultimate Fighter within the first week of the show. In exchange, Scarola opened his own academy which has created a feud among the two former friends. Relieving Scarola from his duties was difficult for Serra as the two were close friends, with Scarola serving as best man at Serra's wedding.

The two coaches were scheduled to face off for the UFC Welterweight Championship after the conclusion of the series at UFC 79. Serra, however, was forced to withdraw from the fight due to a herniated disc in his lower back. The injury became evident when Serra was demonstrating a move to his student and fell to the floor in excruciating pain. In Serra's place, Georges St-Pierre fought and defeated Matt Hughes for what was then the interim UFC welterweight title. This led to Serra holding the welterweight title while St-Pierre held the interim title.

After St-Pierre vs Hughes at UFC 79, Serra confirmed to NBC Sports that his back was rapidly improving. He announced that he was scheduled to fight Georges St-Pierre at the first event to take place in Canada, UFC 83. This match would unify the interim and regular welterweight belts.

Rematch with St-Pierre, fight with Matt Hughes, and retirement
At UFC 83 on April 19, 2008, Serra fought Georges St-Pierre in a match to determine the undisputed welterweight champion during the UFC's first-ever event in Canada, at the Bell Centre in Montreal, Quebec. Instead of striking, St-Pierre pressed the action early with a takedown and kept mixing up his attack, never allowing Serra the chance to mount a significant offense. In the second round, St-Pierre continued his previous actions, forcing Serra into the turtle position and delivering repeated knees to Serra's midsection. When Serra was unable to improve his position or defend against the strikes, referee Yves Lavigne stopped the fight.

Serra suffered a unanimous decision loss to Matt Hughes at UFC 98. Serra hurt Hughes early on in the fight with an inadvertent head-butt and a follow-up flurry of hooks. However, Hughes recovered and went on to win a close decision. After the fight Hughes and Serra embraced each other and ended their feud.

At UFC 109, Serra defeated Frank Trigg via KO (punches) at 2:23 of the first round, awarding him Knockout of the Night Honors. Serra was rumored to be headlining UFC Fight Night 22 on April 17, 2010, versus Mike Swick, but the fight was turned down by Swick due to an arm injury.

At UFC 119 Serra fought Chris Lytle on September 25, 2010. Serra lost the fight via unanimous decision.

In an interview with Ariel Helwani at UFC 131 Serra addressed when or if he would be fighting in the UFC in the foreseeable future. Between the birth of his second child and the rigors of training (Serra himself confirmed that he weighed somewhere around 200 lbs. at interview time), he likened his current situation to that of Rocky Balboa in the sixth film of the series, saying that he still "had some stuff in the basement". 

On May 22, 2013, Serra retired from MMA, stating he would only return to MMA again to fight at an event held at Madison Square Garden in New York City.

UFC Unfiltered

As of June 2016, Matt Serra currently hosts the official UFC podcast UFC Unfiltered with comedian Jim Norton as co-host.

UFC Hall of Fame

On the 5th July 2018 Matt Serra was inducted into the UFC Hall of Fame Class of 2018 in the pioneer wing.

Personal life
Matt and his wife Ann were married on May 26, 2007. The couple have two daughters born in February 2009 and April 2011.

Serra co-owns a Brazilian jiu-jitsu school in Huntington, New York with his younger brother Nick. He currently trains with Ray Longo and trains fighters such as former UFC Middleweight Champion Chris Weidman, UFC Bantamweight Champion Aljamain Sterling, Gian Villante, Pete Sell, Luke Cummo, and The Ultimate Fighter: Live Finalist Al Iaquinta. They fight under the Serra-Longo Fight Team. After being absent from Aljamain Sterling's corner for UFC 259, Serra announced that he would be retiring from cornerman duties moving forward, although he would still remain as head coach for Serra-Longo Fight Team.

Instructor lineage 
Jigoro Kano → Mitsuyo Maeda → Carlos Gracie, Sr. → Helio Gracie → Rolls Gracie → Carlos Gracie, Jr. → Renzo Gracie → Matt Serra

Championships and achievements

Mixed martial arts
Ultimate Fighting Championship
 UFC Hall of Fame (Pioneer wing, class of 2018)
UFC Welterweight Championship (One time)
The Ultimate Fighter 4 Welterweight Tournament Winner
Fight of the Night (One time) vs. Matt Hughes
Knockout of the Night (Two times) vs. Georges St-Pierre, Frank Trigg
First fighter to win both a The Ultimate Fighter Tournament and UFC Championship
Sports Illustrated
2000s Upset of the Decade vs. Georges St-Pierre
2000s Cinderella Story of the Decade vs. Georges St-Pierre
Bleacher Report
2000s Upset of the Decade vs. Georges St-Pierre
Fight Matrix
Most Noteworthy Match of Year (2007) vs. Georges St-Pierre
Most Noteworthy Upset of Year (2007)  vs. Georges St-Pierre
Yahoo! Sports
Upset of the Decade Runner-up vs. Georges St-Pierre

Grappling credentials
ADCC Submission Wrestling World Championship
2000 ADCC Tournament Trials: Champion
2001 ADCC 77 kg: Silver Medalist
Record of opponents:
Won: Takanori Gomi (sub), Jean Jacques Machado (pts), Leonardo Silva Dos Santos (sub)
Lost: Marcio Feitosa (forfeit)
International Pro-Ams
2000 Black Belt 77 kg (No-Gi): Silver Medalist
World Jiu-Jitsu Championship
2000 Brown Belt Medio: Bronze Medalist
Pan-American Championships
1999 Purple Belt Medio: Gold Medalist

Mixed martial arts record

|-
| Loss
| align=center| 11–7
| Chris Lytle
| Decision (unanimous)
| UFC 119
| 
| align=center| 3
| align=center| 5:00
| Indianapolis, Indiana, United States
| 
|-
| Win
| align=center| 11–6
| Frank Trigg
| TKO (punches)
| UFC 109
| 
| align=center| 1
| align=center| 2:23
| Las Vegas, Nevada, United States
| 
|-
| Loss
| align=center| 10–6
| Matt Hughes
| Decision (unanimous)
| UFC 98
| 
| align=center| 3
| align=center| 5:00
| Las Vegas, Nevada, United States
| 
|-
| Loss
| align=center| 10–5
| Georges St-Pierre
| TKO (knees to the body and punches)
| UFC 83
| 
| align=center| 2
| align=center| 4:45
| Montreal, Quebec, Canada
| 
|-
| Win
| align=center| 10–4
| Georges St-Pierre
| TKO (punches)
| UFC 69
| 
| align=center| 1
| align=center| 3:25
| Houston, Texas, United States
| 
|-
| Win
| align=center| 9–4
| Chris Lytle
| Decision (split)
| The Ultimate Fighter: The Comeback Finale
| 
| align=center| 3
| align=center| 5:00
| Las Vegas, Nevada, United States
| 
|-
| Loss
| align=center| 8–4
| Karo Parisyan
| Decision (unanimous)
| UFC 53
| 
| align=center| 3
| align=center| 5:00
| Atlantic City, New Jersey, United States
| 
|-
| Win
| align=center| 8–3
| Ivan Menjivar
| Decision (unanimous)
| UFC 48
| 
| align=center| 3
| align=center| 5:00
| Las Vegas, Nevada, United States
| 
|-
| Win
| align=center| 7–3
| Jeff Curran
| Decision (unanimous)
| UFC 46
| 
| align=center| 3
| align=center| 5:00
| Las Vegas, Nevada, United States
| 
|-
| Loss
| align=center| 6–3
| Din Thomas
| Decision (split)
| UFC 41
| 
| align=center| 3
| align=center| 5:00
| Atlantic City, New Jersey, United States
| 
|-
| Loss
| align=center| 6–2
| B.J. Penn
| Decision (unanimous)
| UFC 39
| 
| align=center| 3
| align=center| 5:00
| Uncasville, Connecticut, United States
| 
|-
| Win
| align=center| 6–1
| Kelly Dullanty
| Submission (triangle choke)
| UFC 36
| 
| align=center| 1
| align=center| 2:58
| Las Vegas, Nevada, United States
| 
|-
| Win
| align=center| 5–1
| Yves Edwards
| Decision (majority)
| UFC 33
| 
| align=center| 3
| align=center| 5:00
| Las Vegas, Nevada, United States
| 
|-
| Loss
| align=center| 4–1
| Shonie Carter
| KO (spinning back fist)
| UFC 31
| 
| align=center| 3
| align=center| 4:51
| Atlantic City, New Jersey, United States
| 
|-
| Win
| align=center| 4–0
| Greg Melisi
| Submission (armbar)
| VATV 11
| 
| align=center| 1
| align=center| 0:46
| Plainview, New York, United States
| 
|-
| Win
| align=center| 3–0
| Jeff Telvi
| Submission (guillotine choke)
| VATV 7
| 
| align=center| 1
| align=center| 0:30
| Plainview, New York, United States
| 
|-
| Win
| align=center| 2–0
| Graham Lewis
| Submission (armbar)
| VATV 6
| 
| align=center| 1
| align=center| 1:04
| Plainview, New York, United States
| 
|-
| Win
| align=center| 1–0
| Khamzat Vitaev
| Submission (rear-naked choke)
| VATV 3
| 
| align=center| 1
| align=center| 0:36
| Plainview, New York, United States
| 

| Win
| align=center| 2–0
| Shonie Carter
| Decision (unanimous)
| rowspan=2|The Ultimate Fighter 4
|  (airdate)
| align=center| 3
| align=center| 5:00
| rowspan=2|Las Vegas, Nevada, United States
| 
|-
| Win
| align=center| 1–0
| Pete Spratt
| TKO (submission to punches)
|  (airdate)
| align=center| 1
| align=center| 3:26
|

Vale Tudo rules

| Win
| align=center| 2–0
| Scott Schultz
| Submission (armbar)
| New York Regional
| 
| align=center| 1
| align=center| 3:35
| Manhattan, New York, United States
| 

|-
| Win
| align=center| 1–0
| Unknown
| Decision (unanimous)
| Bama Fight Night 1
| 
| align=center| 1
| align=center| 10:00
| Bayside Academy of Martial Arts in Elizabeth, New Jersey, United States
|

ADCC submission grappling record

Matt Serra lost to Feitosa in what appeared to be a very controversial decision. It was tradition when two practitioners from the same school meet each other in a tournament, the lower ranking student in that school's hierarchy will generally forfeit the match out of respect.

Pay-per-view bouts
{|class="wikitable sortable"
!No
!Event
!Fight
!Date
!Venue
!City
!PPV buys
|-
|1.
|UFC 69
|St-Pierre vs. Serra
|7 April 2007
|Toyota Center
|Houston, Texas, U.S
|400,000
|-
|2.
|UFC 83
|St-Pierre vs. Serra 2
|19 April 2008
|Bell Centre
|Montreal, Quebec, Canada
|530,000
|-
! colspan="6" |Total sales
! 930,000

References

External links
Official UFC Profile
Matt Serra profile
Official site
Matt Serra and Long Island in the UFC

The Ultimate Fighter winners
American male mixed martial artists
Mixed martial artists from New York (state)
Living people
American practitioners of Brazilian jiu-jitsu
Ultimate Fighting Championship champions
Welterweight mixed martial artists
American people of Italian descent
1974 births
People awarded a black belt in Brazilian jiu-jitsu
People from East Meadow, New York
People from Massapequa, New York
Ultimate Fighting Championship male fighters
American Wing Chun practitioners
Mixed martial artists utilizing Wing Chun
Mixed martial artists utilizing Brazilian jiu-jitsu
East Meadow High School alumni